Ayotle is a French-Mexican company headquartered in Paris, France, that develops computer vision software. It provides technical services based on motion capture and 3D sensors for interactive applications to the media and entertainment industry. The company was co-founded by José Alonso Ybanez Zepeda and Gisèle Belliot in June 2010.

Ayotle is mainly focused on the development and implementation of advanced algorithms for computer vision, from video images in all formats, and to the use of 3D cameras or depth sensors.

Etymology
The name Ayotle comes from the word ayotl, which means turtle shell in Nahuatl, the original language used by the Aztecs in Mexico.

Supports
Ayotle is currently supported by Paris Region Lab, ASTIA, Mairie de Paris, Oséo, Scientipôle Initiative, Cap-Digital, Telecom ParisTech

References

Computer vision software
Middleware
Agile software development
Computer animation